Frendo is a surname. Notable people with the surname include:

Cleavon Frendo (born 1985), Maltese footballer
George Anthony Frendo (born 1946), Maltese Roman Catholic bishop
Glen Frendo, Australian rugby league player
Henry Frendo (born 1948), Maltese historian
Michael Frendo (born 1955), Maltese politician
Michael Frendo (engineer) (born 1960), Canadian engineer and businessman

Maltese-language surnames